The All-American Amateur Baseball Association (AAABA) is an amateur/collegiate wood bat baseball organization that holds an annual tournament that takes place every August at Point Stadium in Johnstown, Pennsylvania.  The annual event features 16 teams representing the Eastern, Southwestern and Midwestern regions.  Alumni from this event include hundreds of NCAA Division I and Major League Baseball greats.

History
See footnote
The AAABA was founded in 1944 and played its first tournament in 1945.  The tournament has always been held at Point Stadium with the exception of 1946 when the tournament was held in Washington, DC, and in 1977 when the tournament was moved to Altoona, Pennsylvania, due to the third great flood in Johnstown.  The tournament celebrated in 75th anniversary in 2019, but the annual tournament was cancelled for 2020 due to the COVID-19 pandemic.

Teams
Hundreds of teams have played in this tournament over the years.  Notable teams participating in recent years include the New Orleans Boosters (New Orleans), Paul Carpenter Capital Advisors (Johnstown), Martella's Pharmacy (Johnstown), the Philly Bandits (Philadelphia), the Carolina Disco Turkeys (North Carolina), New Brunswick Matrix (New Brunswick) and many others.

World Series
Sixteen teams participate in the AAABA World Series. The 74th annual AAABA World Series will conclude on August 11, 2018, in Johnstown, Pennsylvania. The regionals were held in Altoona, Pennsylvania.

Hall of fame
The AAABA established a hall of fame in 1994. It is located near the main entrance in Point Stadium, in Johnstown.

See also
Point Stadium, Johnstown, Pa.
Baseball awards#U.S. amateur baseball
Amateur baseball in the United States

Footnotes

External links
All-American Amateur Baseball Association official website

Baseball governing bodies in the United States
Baseball in Pennsylvania
Johnstown, Pennsylvania
Sports organizations established in 1944

Amateur baseball in the United States
1944 establishments in Pennsylvania